Dorsal branch may refer to:

 Dorsal branch of ulnar nerve
 Dorsal carpal branch of the radial artery
 Dorsal carpal branch of the ulnar artery
 Dorsal cutaneous branches